Malith Gunathilake (born 29 March 1987) is a Sri Lankan cricketer. He played 22 first-class and 13 List A matches for multiple domestic sides in Sri Lanka between 2008 and 2013. His last first-class match was for Colombo Cricket Club in the 2012–13 Premier Trophy on 30 March 2013.

See also
 List of Chilaw Marians Cricket Club players

References

External links
 

1987 births
Living people
Sri Lankan cricketers
Badureliya Sports Club cricketers
Chilaw Marians Cricket Club cricketers
Colombo Cricket Club cricketers
Place of birth missing (living people)